Morisset is a commercial centre and suburb of the City of Lake Macquarie, in Newcastle, located in the Hunter Region in New South Wales, Australia, and is located west of Lake Macquarie just off the Sydney-Newcastle Freeway. It is also located approximately halfway between Gosford and Newcastle. The count at the 2016 Census was 3,213 for the gazetted suburb of Morisset. The estimated urban population of the Morisset area, including Cooranbong, was 25,662 as at June 2019. The area has experienced moderate growth over the five years to 2019 with an average year-on-year rate of 1.79 percent.

History
The town is named for Major James Thomas Morisset, who camped there in 1823 while making the overland journey from Sydney to Newcastle. Morisset went on to become Commandant at Norfolk Island prison between 1829–1833, where his brutal regime led to a rebellion. Historically there has been considerable confusion over the spelling of the suburb: Morissett, Morriset, Morrissett and Morrisset have been used. 

Initially, various kinds of agriculture were conducted, and before long forestry became an important industry. Most of the transport to the area at the time was by river boat on Dora Creek meaning that Cooranbong was the most accessible part of town. The town of Morisset itself was essentially non-existent until 1887, when the Sydney-Newcastle railway was built. Morisset sprang up as a sawmill town clustered around the train station, and the township was proclaimed on 3 December. 

In 1908, a psychiatric hospital opened on a large estate along the lake shore. At its height in the 1960s, Morisset Mental Hospital had 1,600 patients. The Hospital continues to dominate Morisset's reputation, although it is now only a 130-bed hospital.

The first bus service was started by the Ward family.

In more recent times, the Morisset Peninsula to the east of the town has become the main residential area. It has experienced a high rate of growth since the construction of Eraring Power Station in 1986. Most of Bonnells Bay is now what long-time residents quaintly refer to as "high-density housing", although by city standards it is decidedly low-density. Several retirement villages have been built, most of them only in the last decade. Subdivision of larger blocks has come close to saturation in many suburbs, with only a few hobby-farms still remaining, although the majority of the Morisset district and peninsula remain bushland and National Park and Aboriginal reserves.

Heritage listings

Morisset has a number of heritage-listed sites, including:
 Morisset Park Road: Morisset Hospital

Education
Morisset contains a state primary school, a state high school and a Catholic school. Morisset Public School opened in 1891 and started accommodating high school classes in 1951. These classes transferred to a new high school campus, Morisset High School, at the start of the 1965 school year, with the public school returning to purely primary education. 

A Catholic primary school, St John Vianney School, opened on 17 January 1962, and was initially administered by the Sisters of St Joseph until becoming part of the Roman Catholic Diocese of Maitland-Newcastle in 1966.

Transport

Morisset railway station, located on Dora Street, is linked to Sydney and Newcastle by NSW TrainLink services on the Central Coast & Newcastle Line, and to Maitland and towns further north by long-distance services.

The train station serves as a terminus for bus services 278 and 279 covering the Morisset Peninsula towns and 280 to Cooranbong. These services are operated by Hunter Valley Buses, which acquired the previous provider Toronto Bus. In July 2009, Rover Coaches commenced a new weekday service, Route 163, to Cessnock and Kurri Kurri.

Media 
Christian radio may be heard on 87.8 FM around the town broadcasting 3ABN Australia Radio Network.
3ABN Australia Production Centre is also located in Morisset.

Further reading
 Iron Horse and Iron Bark: A history of Morisset and district, Beryl Mullard, 
 A Private World on a Nameless Bay - a history of Morisset Hospital, Morisset Hospital Historical Society,

References

External links

 History of Morisset  (Lake Macquarie City Library)
 Morisset Hospital Historical Society
 3ABN Australia, Inc.

Suburbs of Lake Macquarie